Cloud 9: The 3 Day High is a collaborative album from Brooklyn rapper Skyzoo and North Carolina producer 9th Wonder. It was released on September 12, 2006 on Traffic Entertainment. Cloud 9: The 3 Day High reportedly took a total of three days to complete from start to finish. The EP became an underground favorite and garnered Skyzoo media write ups in outlets such as XXL, The Source, Vibe, AllHipHop.com, HipHopDX.com, and  HipHopGame.com.

Track listing

Samples

Personnel

Skyzoo - primary artist
9th Wonder - primary artist

References

External links
Cloud 9: The 3 Day High at Allmusic

2006 albums
Skyzoo albums
Albums produced by 9th Wonder